Cass County is a county in the U.S. state of North Dakota. As of the 2020 United States Census, the population was 184,525. Cass County is the most populous county in North Dakota, accounting for nearly 24% of the state's population. The county seat is Fargo, the state's most populous city.

Cass County is part of the Fargo, ND-Moorhead, MN Metropolitan Statistical Area.

History
Cass County was defined by action of the Dakota Territory legislature on January 4, 1873, and its organization was effected on October 27 of that year. It was named for railroad executive George Washington Cass (1810 - 1888). Its boundaries were altered in 1875, and in 1961.

Geography
Cass County lies on the east side of North Dakota. Its east boundary line abuts the west boundary line of the state of Minnesota across the river. The Red River flows northward along the county's east boundary, on its way to Lake Winnipeg and Hudson Bay. The county's terrain consists of low rolling hills, devoted to agriculture except around developed areas. Its terrain slopes to the north and east, with its highest point on the southwestern corner at 1,194' (364m) ASL.

Major highways

  Interstate 29
  Interstate 94
  U.S. Highway 10
  U.S. Highway 52
  U.S. Highway 81
  North Dakota Highway 10
  North Dakota Highway 18
  North Dakota Highway 38
  North Dakota Highway 46
  North Dakota Highway 294

Adjacent counties

 Traill County - north
 Norman County, Minnesota - northeast
 Clay County, Minnesota - east
 Richland County - southeast
 Ransom County - southwest
 Barnes County - west
 Steele County - northwest

Lakes
Cass County has the following lakes:
 Brewer Lake
 Lake Bertha

Demographics

2000 census
As of the 2000 census, there were 123,138 people, 51,315 households, and 29,814 families in the county. The racial makeup of the county was 95.10% White, 0.81% Black or African American, 1.08% Native American, 1.26% Asian, 0.03% Pacific Islander, 0.43% from other races, and 1.29% from two or more races. 1.23% of the population were Hispanic or Latino of any race. 34.1% were of German and 32.4% Norwegian ancestry.

There were 51,315 households, out of which 29.9% had children under the age of 18 living with them, 47.3% were married couples living together, 7.6% had a female householder with no husband present, and 41.9% were non-families. 31.2% of all households were made up of individuals, and 7.6% had someone living alone who was 65 years of age or older. The average household size was 2.32 and the average family size was 2.98.

The county population contained 23.4% under the age of 18, 16.0% from 18 to 24, 31.3% from 25 to 44, 19.6% from 45 to 64, and 9.7% who were 65 years of age or older. The median age was 31 years. For every 100 females, there were 100.3 males. For every 100 females age 18 and over, there were 99.5 males.

The median income for a household in the county was $38,147, and the median income for a family was $51,469. Males had a median income of $32,216 versus $22,300 for females. The per capita income for the county was $20,889. About 5.7% of families and 10.1% of the population were below the poverty line, including 9.1% of those under age 18 and 8.1% of those age 65 or over.

2010 census
As of the 2010 census, there were 149,778 people, 63,899 households, and 35,215 families in the county. The racial makeup of the county was 91.7% white, 2.4% Asian, 2.3% black or African American, 1.2% American Indian, 0.5% from other races, and 1.9% from two or more races. Those of Hispanic or Latino origin made up 2.0% of the population. In terms of ancestry, 45.4% were German, 35.8% were Norwegian, 9.2% were Irish, 6.3% were Swedish, and 1.7% were American.

Of the 63,899 households, 27.8% had children under the age of 18 living with them, 42.9% were married couples living together, 8.3% had a female householder with no husband present, 44.9% were non-families, and 33.0% of all households were made up of individuals. The average household size was 2.27 and the average family size was 2.94. The median age was 31.5 years.

The median income for a household in the county was $47,600 and the median income for a family was $68,858. Males had a median income of $42,557 versus $31,916 for females. The per capita income for the county was $28,184. About 5.8% of families and 12.8% of the population were below the poverty line, including 11.0% of those under age 18 and 10.1% of those age 65 or over.

Population by decade

Government
Cass County is governed by a board of commissioners elected to four-year terms. Other elected officials include the sheriff and state's attorney. Appointed officials include administrator, extension agent, director of tax equalization, finance auditor, highway engineer, human services officer, information technology coordinator, recorder, veterans service officer, and weed control officer.

The current Sheriff is Jesse F. Jahner. Jahner has served as Sheriff of Cass County since January 2, 2019.

The voters of Cass County have historically tended to vote Republican. As recently as the 2004 presidential election, George W. Bush carried Cass County with nearly 60 percent of the vote. However, in recent elections, the county has become more politically diverse and competitive, particularly in Fargo. Since 2008, no Republican presidential candidate has received over 50% of the vote in Cass County. In 2008, Democratic candidate Barack Obama won the majority of votes in Cass County, with a voting percentage very close to the percentage Obama received in the entire nation, while John McCain won the majority of votes in North Dakota. Mitt Romney's winning margin in 2012 over Obama in Cass County was 49.9% to 47%, while Donald Trump received 49.3% of votes in 2016, compared to 38.8% for Hillary Clinton and 11.9% for third-party candidates. In 2018, Democratic Senator Heidi Heitkamp achieved a 14-point lead in Eastern North Dakota, although the state as a whole soundly elected Republican Kevin Cramer.

Communities

Cities

 Alice
 Amenia
 Argusville
 Arthur
 Ayr
 Briarwood
 Buffalo
 Casselton
 Davenport
 Enderlin
 Fargo (County seat)
 Frontier
 Gardner
 Grandin
 Harwood
 Horace
 Hunter
 Kindred
 Leonard
 Mapleton
 North River
 Oxbow
 Page
 Prairie Rose
 Reile's Acres
 Tower City
 West Fargo

Census-designated places

 Brooktree Park
 Embden
 Erie
 Wheatland

Unincorporated communities
 Absaraka
 Chaffee
 Wild Rice
 Prosper

Townships

 Addison
 Amenia
 Arthur
 Ayr
 Barnes
 Bell
 Berlin
 Buffalo
 Casselton
 Clifton
 Cornell
 Davenport
 Dows
 Durbin
 Eldred
 Empire
 Erie
 Everest
 Fargo
 Gardner
 Gill
 Gunkel
 Harmony
 Harwood
 Highland
 Hill
 Howes
 Hunter
 Kinyon
 Lake
 Leonard
 Maple River
 Mapleton
 Noble
 Normanna
 Page
 Pleasant
 Pontiac
 Raymond
 Reed
 Rich
 Rochester
 Rush River
 Stanley
 Tower
 Walburg
 Warren
 Watson
 Wheatland
 Wiser

Education
School districts include:

K-12:

 Central Cass Public School District 17
 Enderlin Area Public School District 24
 Fargo Public School District 1
 Hope-Page Public Schools
 Kindred Public School District 2
 Maple Valley Public School District 4
 May-Port CG Public School District 14
 Northern Cass Public School District 97
 West Fargo Public School District 6

Elementary:
 Mapleton Public School District 7

Former districts:
 Page Public School District 80 - Consolidated with Hope district in 2020

See also
 National Register of Historic Places listings in Cass County, North Dakota

References

External links
 Cass County official website
 Cass County maps, Sheet 1  (northern) and Sheet 2  (southern), North Dakota DOT

 
Fargo–Moorhead
1873 establishments in Dakota Territory
Populated places established in 1873